Niasoma metallicana is a species of moth of the family Tortricidae. It is found in the United States in the states of Florida, Louisiana, Maryland, Massachusetts, Mississippi, New Jersey and Texas.

The wingspan is 14–21 mm.

References

Moths described in 1895
Sparganothini